Samseong Jungang Station is a railway station on Seoul Subway Line 9 that opened March 28, 2015.

Station layout

Gallery

References

Seoul Metropolitan Subway stations
Metro stations in Gangnam District
Railway stations opened in 2015
2015 establishments in South Korea